Héctor Gerardo Estrada Treviño (born 6 January 1993) is a Mexican professional footballer who plays as a goalkeeper for Potros UAEM.

References

1993 births
Living people
Association football goalkeepers
Potros UAEM footballers
Ascenso MX players
Liga Premier de México players
Tercera División de México players
Footballers from Nuevo León
Sportspeople from Monterrey
Mexican footballers